Cameron Norrie was the defending champion but chose not to defend his title.

Michael Mmoh won the title after defeating Marcel Granollers 6–3, 7–5 in the final.

Seeds

Draw

Finals

Top half

Bottom half

References
Main draw
Qualifying draw

2018 ATP Challenger Tour
2018 Singles